Hafidullah (born 1 March 1996) is a Pakistani cricketer. He made his List A debut on 12 January 2017 for Federally Administered Tribal Areas in the 2016–17 Regional One Day Cup.

References

External links
 

1996 births
Living people
Pakistani cricketers
Federally Administered Tribal Areas cricketers
Place of birth missing (living people)